"FuckWithMeYouKnowIGotIt" is a song by rapper Jay-Z recorded for his 12th studio album Magna Carta Holy Grail. The song features Def Jam labelmate rapper Rick Ross. The song was produced by the Toronto, Canada producer Boi-1da, Vinylz, Timbaland and J-Roc. The song peaked at number 64 on the U.S. Billboard Hot 100. Complex ranked "FuckWithMeYouKnowIGotIt" number 20 on their list of the 50 best songs of 2013.  David Ortiz of the Boston Red Sox used the song as his batter intro while stepping onto the field.

Production
The instrumental for "FuckWithMeYouKnowIGotIt" was started by Vinylz who was inspired by a Pimp C speech he found on YouTube. He sampled his voice for the intro and then created the rest of the song in "like five minutes." After fellow producer Boi-1da did some more work on it, it was sent to Rick Ross who intended to use it for his album, Mastermind. Jay-Z was supposed to add a guest verse to it, but when he heard the instrumental, he wanted the track for his album. Timbaland added additional changes to it before the final version was created for the album. Rick Ross, however, recorded a solo version, dubbed "You Know I Got It (Reprise)," for his album Mastermind as a deluxe edition bonus track in 2014.

Chart performance

Weekly charts

Year-end charts

Certifications

References

2013 songs
Jay-Z songs
Rick Ross songs
Song recordings produced by Boi-1da
Song recordings produced by Timbaland
Songs written by Jay-Z
Songs written by Rick Ross
Songs written by Timbaland
Song recordings produced by Vinylz
Songs written by Vinylz
Songs written by Jerome "J-Roc" Harmon
Dirty rap songs